Szeps is a surname. Notable people with the surname include:

Josh Szeps (born 1977), Australian media personality
Henri Szeps (born 1943), Australian actor
Moritz Szeps (1835–1902), Austrian journalist 
Berta Zuckerkandl (born Bertha Szeps), Austrian writer